Wisconsin sports includes numerous professional and amateur sporting teams, events, and venues located in the U.S. state of Wisconsin.

Professional teams

Wisconsin is represented by major league teams in the three most popular spectator sports in the United States: American football, baseball, and basketball. The Green Bay Packers have been part of the National Football League since the league's second season in 1921 and currently hold the record for the most NFL titles, earning the city of Green Bay the nickname "Titletown".

Former professional teams

College sports

National Collegiate Athletic Association

Wisconsin is also rich in college sports. Below are Wisconsin's teams participating in the NCAA:

National Association of Intercollegiate Athletics

National Christian College Athletic Association

Wisconsin Collegiate Conference

Italics – also a member of the Wisconsin Junior College Athletic Association

Wisconsin Junior College Athletic Association

Italics – also a member of the Wisconsin Technical College Conference

Wisconsin Technical College Conference

Notable semi-professional and amateur leagues

Motor racing venues
Two world championships are held in Wisconsin. The World Championship Snowmobile Derby is held at Eagle River, Wisconsin. The world championship off-road racing event is held at Crandon International Off-Road Raceway.

The Milwaukee Mile, an oval track opened in 1903, is the oldest operating motorsports venue in the world, having hosted the IndyCar Series and NASCAR Xfinity Series. Road America, a road course opened in 1955, currently hosts the IndyCar Series, NASCAR Xfinity Series, IMSA WeatherTech SportsCar Championship and SCCA Pirelli World Challenge.

Former venues

Notable golf clubs and courses

See also
Sports in Milwaukee
Wisconsin Athletic Walk of Fame

References

External links